In Canada, a number of sites and structures are named for royal individuals, whether a member of the past French royal family, British royal family, or present Canadian royal family thus reflecting the country's status as a constitutional monarchy under the Canadian Crown. Those who married into the royal family are indicated by an asterisk (*). Charles Edward Stuart was a pretender to the British throne.

Eponymous royalty

King Francis I

Queen Elizabeth I

King Henry IV

Queen Henrietta Maria

Prince Rupert

King Louis XIV

Queen Anne

Louis, Dauphin of France

King George I

King George II

Prince Frederick (1707–1751)

Charles Edward Stuart

Prince William (1721–1765)

King George III

Queen Charlotte*

Prince Frederick (1763–1827)

Princess Frederica*

Prince Edward (1767–1820)

Prince Augustus

Prince Adolphus

Princess Augusta

Princess Mary

Princess Sophia

Princess Amelia

King George IV

Queen Caroline*

King Leopold I*

King William IV

Queen Adelaide*

Queen Victoria

Prince Albert*

Princess Victoria

Princess Alice

Prince Alfred

Princess Helena

Princess Louise (1848–1939)

The Duke of Argyll*

Prince Arthur

Princess Patricia

Prince Leopold

Princess Beatrice

The Earl of Athlone*

King Edward VII

Queen Alexandra*

Princess Maud

Princess Louise (1867–1931)

King George V

Queen Mary*

Prince George

King Edward VIII

King George VI

Queen Elizabeth*

Princess Margaret

Queen Elizabeth II

Prince Philip*

King Charles III

Diana, Princess of Wales*

Queen Camilla*

Prince William (1982–present)

Princess Anne

Prince Andrew

Prince Edward (1964–present)

Lady Louise Windsor

Viscount Severn

Various

See also
 Royal monuments in Canada
 Viceregal eponyms in Canada

Notes

References

 
 

Monarchy in Canada
Lists of eponyms
Lists of Canada placename etymologies